Price Club was an American warehouse store chain. It merged with its competitor, Costco Wholesale, in 1993 and adopted the Costco name in 1997. The original Price Club warehouse is still open, operating as Costco location #401.

Sol Price founded Price Club, creating the concept in 1975 after being forced out of FedMart, another retail chain he founded. He and several friends invested $2.5 million. The first Price Club on July 12, 1976, in San Diego, California, the former site of a manufacturing building previously owned by Howard Hughes.
Club membership was initially only available to business customers, but was later opened to certain groups, such as employees of local businesses, nonprofits, and government. The company charged shoppers a $25 annual membership fee to purchase bulk products at discount prices in a no-frills warehouse setting. Price Club's high sales volume enabled Sol Price to give his employees more benefits and higher wages than typical retailers. The company expanded to 94 locations throughout the United States, Canada, and Mexico (joint venture with Controladora Comercial Mexicana). In 1992, Price Club generated $6.6 billion in revenue and $134.1 million in profit.

Price Club merged with rival Costco in 1993 and the combined company was known as PriceCostco. Price Club and Costco continued to operate as separate stores with members of either chain being able to shop at both stores with their membership cards. In 1997, PriceCostco became Costco Wholesale Corporation and the remaining Price Clubs were rebranded as Costco.

References 

Defunct retail companies of the United States
Companies based in San Diego
Defunct companies based in California
Retail companies based in California
1976 establishments in California
1997 disestablishments in California
Costco
1993 mergers and acquisitions
Retail companies disestablished in 1997